Eria coronaria is a species of orchid. It is native to Guangxi, Hainan, Tibet, Yunnan , the Himalayas, Thailand and Vietnam.

References

coronaria
Orchids of China
Orchids of Thailand
Orchids of Vietnam
Flora of Assam (region)
Flora of East Himalaya
Flora of Nepal
Plants described in 1841